The Providence Commercial Historic District, in Providence, Kentucky, is a historic district which was listed on the National Register of Historic Places in 1993.  It includes 25 contributing buildings and four non-contributing ones, along the 100-200 blocks on East and West Main and on North and South Broadway in downtown Providence.

The contributing buildings include:
Alexander Niswonger Store (1911), 104 North Broadway, a two-story brick building with original cast iron storefront
Nisbet-Berry Block (c. 1910), 105 and 107 West Main, with stepped back false front cornice.  Both buildings have three arched brick bays on their second story
Providence Banking Company (1914),  107 South Broadway, Beaux-Arts-style facade of Bowling Green marble

References

Historic districts on the National Register of Historic Places in Kentucky
Victorian architecture in Kentucky
Neoclassical architecture in Kentucky
Beaux-Arts architecture in Kentucky
Buildings and structures completed in 1882
National Register of Historic Places in Webster County, Kentucky
Commercial buildings on the National Register of Historic Places in Kentucky